The Narrow Path is a 1918 American silent drama film directed by George Fitzmaurice and starring Fannie Ward, W.E. Lawrence and Irene Aldwyn.

Cast
 Fannie Ward as Marion Clark 
 W.E. Lawrence as Dick Strong 
 Irene Aldwyn as Gladys Strong 
 Sam De Grasse as Malcolm Dion 
 Mary Alden as Margaret Dunn 
 Antrim Short as Jimmy Glidden

References

Bibliography
 Paul C. Spehr. The Movies Begin: Making Movies in New Jersey, 1887-1920. Newark Museum, 1977.

External links

1918 films
1918 drama films
Silent American drama films
Films directed by George Fitzmaurice
American silent feature films
1910s English-language films
Pathé Exchange films
American black-and-white films
1910s American films